Moffett is a town in Sequoyah County, Oklahoma, United States. It is part of the Fort Smith, Arkansas-Oklahoma Metropolitan Statistical Area. The population was 128 at the 2010 census, a decline of 28.5 percent from the figure of 179 recorded in 2000.

History
After the Civil War, several Cherokee and Cherokee freedmen settled around the present community of Moffett. A post office was established in 1908 and was named for Martha Moffett Payne, wife of Dr. Samuel Payne. The town became an agricultural center, especially for cotton farmers.

Moffett incorporated in 1928. Its population was 340 at the 1930 census, and peaked at 538 in 1940. Before and during World War II, the town's bars and gambling establishments attracted soldiers from nearby Fort Smith, Arkansas and Camp Chaffee. The U.S. Army declared Moffett "off limits" during the war, and kept the ban in place until the mid-1970s. The town began a long decline after World War II. The 1960 census counted 357 residents, and the decline has continued to the present.

Moffett's history has included several damaging floods. The most notable of these occurred in 1943, 1957, 1986, 1990, and 2019.

In 2007, the town filed for Chapter 9 bankruptcy after Oklahoma's attorney general declared it was operating a speed trap, and barred local police from issuing speeding citations. Without the steady stream of citation revenue generated from motorists passing through on U.S. Highway 64, the town was unable to manage the $200,000 in debts incurred by the former mayor.

Geography
Moffett is located at  (35.389791, -94.446286). The town is located in the Arkansas River floodplain, across the river from Fort Smith.

Demographics

As of the census of 2000, there were 179 people, 61 households, and 40 families residing in the town. The racial makeup of the town was 58.10% White, 8.38% African American, 6.15% Native American, and 27.37% from two or more races. Hispanic or Latino of any race were 6.15% of the population.

There were 61 households, out of which 34.4% had children under the age of 18 living with them, 37.7% were married couples living together, 14.8% had a female householder with no husband present, and 32.8% were non-families. 27.9% of all households were made up of individuals, and 18.0% had someone living alone who was 65 years of age or older. The average household size was 2.93 and the average family size was 3.59.

In the town, the population was spread out, with 38.5% under the age of 18, 6.1% from 18 to 24, 26.8% from 25 to 44, 19.0% from 45 to 64, and 9.5% who were 65 years of age or older. The median age was 28 years. For every 100 females, there were 98.9 males. For every 100 females age 18 and over, there were 107.5 males.

The median income for a household in the town was $16,875, and the median income for a family was $18,750. Males had a median income of $29,500 versus $18,125 for females. The per capita income for the town was $9,743. About 34.1% of families and 42.6% of the population were below the poverty line, including 49.1% of those under the age of 18 and 39.1% of those 65 or over.

Country artist Charlie Walker released a song called Moffett, Oklahoma on his 1967 album Don't Squeeze My Sharmon.

References

Towns in Sequoyah County, Oklahoma
Towns in Oklahoma
Fort Smith metropolitan area
Government units that have filed for Chapter 9 bankruptcy
Oklahoma populated places on the Arkansas River